Aduna is a town located in the province of Gipuzkoa, in the autonomous community of Basque Country, in the North of Spain. In 2003, Aduna had a total population of 341.

Aduna as a last name is likely to have a Basque origin, although none of the 341 inhabitants of the town of Aduna has that last name.

References

External links
 Official Website Information available in Spanish and Basque.
 ADUNA in the Bernardo Estornés Lasa - Auñamendi Encyclopedia (Euskomedia Fundazioa) Information available in Spanish [add more info here]

Municipalities in Gipuzkoa